The first season of the Philippine reality singing competition The Voice Teens premiered on April 16, 2017 on ABS-CBN. Lea Salonga, Bamboo Mañalac and Sharon Cuneta, who had appeared in the third season of The Voice Kids returned to the show as coaches; they will also be accompanied by Sarah Geronimo, who had returned to the franchise after a season hiatus. The show is hosted by Toni Gonzaga and Luis Manzano — the two previously teamed up in hosting the second season of The Voice of the Philippines. The show airs every Saturdays 7:15 p.m. (PST) and Sundays at 7:00 p.m. (PST). It runs for 60 minutes. The finale aired on July 30, 2017 with Jona Marie Soquite of Team Sarah as the champion.

Auditions
The ages of the auditionees were from ages 13 to 17 years old.

Teams
Color key

Blind auditions
Out of more or less 10,000 aspirants, only 100 teens were able to proceed in the Blind auditions; 56 thereof were able to join one of the teams and advance to The Battles.

Color key

Episode 1 (April 16)
The coaches performed "Next in Line" by AfterImage prior to the start of the Blind auditions.

Episode 2 (April 22)

Episode 3 (April 23)

Episode 4 (April 29)

Episode 5 (April 30)

Episode 6 (May 6)

Episode 7 (May 7)

Episode 8 (May 13)

Episode 9 (May 14)

Episode 10 (May 20)

Episode 11 (May 21)

Episode 12 (May 27)

Episode 13 (May 28)

Episode 14 (June 3)

The Battles

Starting June 10 (Episode 16), the show runs for 75 minutes instead of the usual 60 due to the recently concluded season of I Can Do That.

For The Battles, the coaches will have to pair two of their artists to sing in a duet. The coaches will then have to select an artist from the pair to advance to the next round. The coaches, for this season are given the power to steal two losing artists from the opposing teams. At the end of this round, seven artists remain on each team with eight artists being stolen creating a total of 36 artists (9 on each team) advancing to The Knockouts.

Color key:

The Knockouts
The Knockout rounds aired from July 1 to 9, 2017. Artists are grouped into three by their respective coaches where only one artist will win in each group. Each artist gets to pick their song. The top 12 contestants will then move on to the "Live Shows."

Color key:

Live shows
The live shows started airing on July 15, 2017. Unlike the previous seasons of The Voice of the Philippines and The Voice Kids, it is being held in the ABS-CBN studios at Quezon City instead of the Newport Performing Arts Theater at the Resorts World Manila in Newport City, Pasay.

The public is only allowed to vote once per mobile number per team. New to this season is the online voting through Google Philippines. By typing the keyword Voice Teens Vote in the search box, clickable photos of the artists that had performed for that day will show up in the search results page; one Google account is entitled to one vote per team only.

The first live show follows the voting format of the third season of The Voice Kids. After the performance of the three artists per team, the public gets to vote on who should advance to the semifinals. Voting was done during the commercial break and closes once the show goes back. The artist with the highest public votes advances to the semifinals. Meanwhile, the coach picks the other artist that will move on to the semifinals, similar to the second season of The Voice of the Philippines.

The semifinals feature a scoring system somewhat similar to the second season of The Voice of the Philippines. Following the performance of the two artists per team, the public gets to vote on who should advance to the finals. Voting was done during the commercial break and closes once the show goes back. After all performances of the night, the coaches give their artists a score from 0 to 100 points. The coaches are not allowed to give the same scores to the artists.

The combined average is 50% public votes and 50% coach votes.

Week 1 (July 15 & 16)
The top eight artists coming from the results of the public votes and coach's choice will advance to the semifinals.

The top twelve artists performed on Saturday and Sunday, July 15–16, 2017, with the results at the end of each show.

Week 2: Semifinals (July 22 & 23)
The top four artists, one per team, coming from the results of the combined public and coach votes will advance to the finals.

Week 3: Finals (July 29 & 30)
Like the previous seasons of The Voice of the Philippines and The Voice Kids, the finals will be aired in a two-part episode on July 29 and 30.

The finals of this season follows the format of The Voice Kids where there are three rounds – duet song with the coach, upbeat song, and the power ballad song.

The winner will be determined through public votes alone. After all the first-day performances, the voting lines were opened. At Sunday, 12:00 mn, the voting lines were closed. The voting continued after the power ballad performances and was closed immediately after a commercial break. The first and second-day votes were combined. The artist with the highest percentage of votes will be declared The Voice Teens Grand Champion.

With Jona Soquite claiming the title, this is the third victory of Sarah Geronimo as coach on all editions of the Philippine franchise of The Voice. Sarah Geronimo is the first coach in all franchises of the Voice around the world that managed artists in three different versions of The Voice (with Jason Dy winning the second season of The Voice of the Philippines and Lyca Gairanod winning the inaugural season of the Philippine version of The Voice Kids).

Elimination Table

Results Summary

Color key
 Artist's info

 Result details

Teams
Artist's info

 Result details

Contestants who appeared on other TV shows or seasons
 Patricia Bonilla competed on TV5's talent searches Talentadong Pinoy Kids and Born to Be a Star. She also appeared in the first season of Idol Philippines under the screen name Trish Bonilla and finished in tenth place.
 Arisxandra Libantino was a finalist on the seventh series of United Kingdom's Britain's Got Talent that aired on ITV in 2013 and finished in eighth place. She had also appeared in Romania's Next Star.
 Jem Macatuno later appeared on the eighth season of Pinoy Big Brother as part of the third batch where he was evicted on Day 38.
 Chan Millanes and Fatima Espiritu later appeared on The Clash but they were eliminated in the first and second rounds respectively.
Kyryll Ugdiman later appeared on the first season of The Clash and finished in seventh place.
 Alessandra Galvez later appeared on the second season of The Clash under the screen name Lorraine Galvez and finished in tenth place. She also won as daily winner in the third season and finished in sixth place in the fifth season of Tawag ng Tanghalan.
 Erika Tenorio, Mia Villaflores, Zyra Peralta and Julian Juangco later appeared on Tawag ng Tanghalan. Mia, Zyra and Julian won as daily winners in the fifth and sixth seasons respectively. Erika and Mia also appeared on the first season of Idol Philippines but they were eliminated in the Do or Die Round.
 Emarjhun de Guzman later appeared and became a 4-time defending champion on the third season of Tawag ng Tanghalan He returned in the Instant Resbak and Final Resbak Week.
 Jomar Pasaron later appeared on Tawag ng Tanghalan. He became a weekly finalist in fifth season but he was eliminated to Reiven Umali who eventually won as the grand champion of the season and later became a 2-time defending champion in the sixth season. He returned in the Quarter 2 Resbakbakan Week.
 Nisha Bedaña later appeared on Tawag ng Tanghalan and Your Moment  as the lead vocalist of Verse Band wherein their group placed as the runner up on the singing category. She also appeared on the second season of Idol Philippines and finished in ninth place.
 Fatima Lagueras later appeared on the inaugural season of Idol Philippines under the screen name, Fatima Louise and finished in eighth place.
 Mikko Estrada and Chloe Redondo later appeared on the second season of Idol Philippines but they were eliminated in the Do or Die Round.
 Bryan Chong later appeared on the first season of The Clash but he was eliminated in the second round. He also appeared on the second season of Idol Philippines and finished in fourth place.
 Paul Asi Gatdula later appeared on Dream Maker but he was eliminated in the third round and finished in Rank 22 of the overall individual ranking.
 Michael Ver Comaling later appeared on Pinoy Big Brother: Kumunity Season 10 as one of the adult housemates. He was one of the Biga-10 housemates. He was evicted on Day 225.
CJ de Guzman later appeared on Kadenang Ginto, as Nica, one of Marga's friends.

References

External links
 The Voice Teens (season 1) on ABS-CBN

The Voice of the Philippines
The Voice Teens (Philippine TV series)
2017 Philippine television seasons